"Kirikirimai" is the second single by the Japanese band Orange Range. It was released on June 4, 2003.

Track listing
 "Kiri Kiri Mai"
 "Samurai Mania"
 "Kirikirimai" - Hisashi Yamada Ver
 "Kirikirimai" - Ryukyudisco Remix
 "Tentekomai"

Charts
The single reached number 50 on the Oricon chart, charted for 18 weeks, and sold 20,206 copies.

References

External links
Official website

2003 singles
Orange Range songs
2003 songs